Cortijo de Miraflores is a historical building in the Pilar Miraflores neighborhood of Marbella, Spain. 

It originated in the cortijo built in 1706 by Tomás Francisco Domínguez y Godoy on the ruins of a former farming estate.

the building houses a number of decorative elements, probably from earlier buildings, such as medallions.

References
Marbella City Council

Buildings and structures in Marbella